Illustrated Daily News may refer to:

Illustrated Daily News, (1923-1954) or Los Angeles Daily News  in Los Angeles, later merged to Los Angeles Mirror
Illustrated Daily News (New York), founded in 1919 by Joseph Medill Patterson and later renamed New York Daily News